Ginseng Nights is the fifth studio album by Rake., released in 2002 by VHF Records.

Track listing

Personnel 
Adapted from the Ginseng Nights liner notes.
Rake.
Jim Ayre – electric guitar, vocals
Bill Kellum – bass guitar
Carl Moller – drums, saxophone

Release history

References

External links 
 Ginseng Nights at Discogs (list of releases)

2002 albums
Rake (band) albums
VHF Records albums